Semechnice is a municipality and village in Rychnov nad Kněžnou District in the Hradec Králové Region of the Czech Republic. It has about 400 inhabitants.

Administrative parts
Villages of Kruhovka and Podchlumí are administrative parts of Semechnice.

References

Villages in Rychnov nad Kněžnou District